Kapari is a religious magazine published monthly in Telugu in Hyderabad and has a reach throughout Andhra Pradesh and Telangana as well as other states among Telugu people.

Overview
The magazine was founded in 1970 by the Baptist preacher, The Rev. Dr. A. B. Masilamani whose name is known all over the two states of Telangana and Andhra Pradesh. The magazine continues to be published to this day. The publisher is New Life Associates.

References

1970 establishments in Andhra Pradesh
Christian magazines
Monthly magazines published in India
Magazines established in 1970
Mass media in Hyderabad, India
Religious magazines

Telugu-language magazines